Michele Alverà (September 5, 1929 – July 18, 1991) was an Italian bobsledder who competed during the early 1950s. He finished 14th in the four-man event at the 1952 Winter Olympics in Oslo.

References
1952 bobsleigh four-man results
Bobsleigh four-man results: 1948-64.
Michele Alverà's profile at Sports Reference.com

1929 births
1991 deaths
Italian male bobsledders
Olympic bobsledders of Italy
Bobsledders at the 1952 Winter Olympics